European Collegium Private School (Приватна Школа Європейський Коллегіум; EC) is a private school for 5 to 18 year-olds in the city of Kyiv, Ukraine. In the year 2018–19, there were 320 pupils on roll. The school is a mixed, bilingual, inclusive community comprehensive school.

The school is part of a Cambridge English School Program and Microsoft Showcase Educational Program.

Schools in Kyiv